The Executives of Construction of Iran Party is a reformist political party in Iran, founded by 16 members of the cabinet of the then President Akbar Hashemi Rafsanjani in 1996. The party is a member of Council for coordinating the Reforms Front.

Views and factions 
Economically, the party supports free markets and industrialization; with a high emphasis on progress and development. The party takes the view that economic freedom is fundamentally linked to cultural and political freedom, but it should not be allowed to conflict with development. The party is divided into two factions in constant struggle, the more conservative "Kermani faction" led by Mohammad Hashemi Rafsanjani and Hossein Marashi and the more liberal "Isfahani faction" led by Mohammad Atrianfar and Gholamhossein Karbaschi.

Members

Founders 
The  party was formed in 1996. The following sixteen people were its founders; they signed the declaration of its formation and founding board members registering the party in Ministry of Interior in 1999 were:

Party leaders

Current officeholders 
Cabinet
 Eshaq Jahangiri (First Vice President) 
 Bijan Namdar Zanganeh (Minister of Petroleum)	
 Isa Kalantari (Vice President for Environment)
Parliament
 Parvaneh Mafi (Tehran, Rey, Shemiranat and Eslamshahr) 
 Fatemeh Saeidi (Tehran, Rey, Shemiranat and Eslamshahr) 
 Abdolreza Hashemzaei (Tehran, Rey, Shemiranat and Eslamshahr) 
 Nahid Tajeddin (Isfahan)
 Mohammad-Bagher Sa'adat (Dashtestan) 
 Masoud Rezaei (Shiraz)
 Vali Maleki (Meshginshahr)
Local
 Mohsen Hashemi Rafsanjani (Chairman of Tehran City Council)
 Shakur Akbarnejad (Chairman of Tabriz City Council)

References

1996 establishments in Iran
Political parties established in 1996
Reformist political groups in Iran
Electoral lists for Iranian legislative election, 1996
Liberal parties in Iran
Right-wing parties in Iran